Cairo is a city in Grady County, Georgia, United States. As of the 2020 census, the city had a population of 10,179. The city is the county seat of Grady County.

History
Cairo was founded in 1835. It was incorporated as a town in 1870 and as a city in 1906. In 1905, Cairo was designated seat of the newly formed Grady County. The city was named after Cairo, the capital of Egypt.

Recreation and entertainment
The local industrial base continues to grow with manufacturing, service, and healthcare companies anchoring a strong economy.

Cairo is home to The Zebulon which is the oldest theater in Georgia. The Zebulon is a single screen movie theater that is still operational today.

The area is home to several local festivals, including Calvary's Mule Day, Whigham's Rattlesnake Roundup, Cairo's own Antique Car Rally, and several competitive recreational programs. The Antique Car Rally features a wide range of cars, and includes many activities: a poker run, a parade, and even a street dance. It usually takes place on the second weekend of May. Sponsored by Mr. Chick, it is an annual event that attracts many people to the southwest corner of Georgia.

Cairo is known worldwide for being the self proclaimed “Motocross Capital of the World”. This comes from being the home to world known motocross training facilities MTF, GPF, and Next level motocross. Cairo is also home to the famous “Goat Farm” previously owned by Ricky Carmichael now owned by Monster Energy Star Racing Yamaha.

Education
Grady County Schools serves the city. Cairo High School, located in Cairo serves as a central high school for all of Grady County. Elementary schools serving students in the city include Eastside Elementary, Northside Elementary and Southside Elementary. Washington Middle School serves Cairo residents.

A campus of the Southern Regional Technical College is located in Cairo.

Health
Grady General Hospital serves the city. A 60-bed acute care facility, it has been affiliated with John D. Archbold Memorial Hospital in Thomasville since 1985.

Geography
Cairo is located in central Grady County at  (30.8774, -84.2013). U.S. Route 84 (38th Boulevard) passes through the northern part of the city, leading east  to Thomasville and west  to Bainbridge. Georgia State Route 93 passes through the center of Cairo as Broad Street and Fifth Street; it leads north  to Pelham and south  to U.S. Route 319 north of the Florida border.

Climate
The climate in this area is characterized by relatively high temperatures and evenly distributed precipitation throughout the year. According to the Köppen Climate Classification system, Cairo has a humid subtropical climate, abbreviated "Cfa" on climate maps.

Demographics

2020 census

As of the 2020 United States Census, there were 10,179 people, 3,567 households, and 2,169 families residing in the city.

2000 census
As of the census of 2000, there were 9,239 people, 3,465 households, and 2,456 families residing in the city. The racial makeup of the city was 51.30% African American, 43.99% White, 0.42% Native American, 0.57% Asian, 0.02% Pacific Islander, 2.80% from other races, and 0.89% from two or more races. Hispanic or Latino of any race were 5.05% of the population.

There were 3,465 households, out of which 34.0% had children under the age of 18 living with them, 41.4% were married couples living together, 24.7% had a female householder with no husband present, and 29.1% were non-families. 25.4% of all households were made up of individuals, and 13.5% had someone living alone who was 65 years of age or older. The average household size was 2.64 and the average family size was 3.14.

In the city, the population was spread out, with 29.1% under the age of 18, 9.4% from 18 to 24, 27.4% from 25 to 44, 20.7% from 45 to 64, and 13.5% who were 65 years of age or older. The median age was 34 years. For every 100 females, there were 83.4 males. For every 100 females age 18 and over, there were 77.6 males.

The median income for a household in the city was $23,054, and the median income for a family was $30,352. Males had a median income of $29,063 versus $20,542 for females. The per capita income for the city was $13,759. About 24.4% of families and 30.0% of the population were below the poverty line, including 41.2% of those under age 18 and 23.4% of those age 65 or over.

Notable people 

Teresa Edwards, former professional basketball player and an Olympic gold medalist
Emerson Hancock, former pitcher for University of Georgia and selected to the Seattle Mariners as the 6th overall pick in the 2020 MLB Draft.
Willie Harris, outfielder and second baseman in Major League Baseball from 2001 through 2012, member of the 2005 World Champion Chicago White Sox
Bryan Johnson, former professional motocross racer.
John Monds, 2010 Libertarian gubernatorial candidate for the state of Georgia
David Ponder, former defensive tackle for the Dallas Cowboys
Ernest Riles, shortstop and third baseman in Major League Baseball
Jackie Robinson, Baseball Hall of Famer; first person to break the color barrier in Major League Baseball; born in Cairo
Matthew "Mack" Robinson, Olympic silver medalist, older brother of Jackie Robinson  
Daryle Singletary, country music singer
George Thornewell Smith, Georgia politician
Bill Stanfill, former All-Pro National Football League defensive end
Mickey Thomas, lead singer of Jefferson Starship
Bobby Walden, former punter for the Pittsburgh Steelers and Minnesota Vikings
J. J. Wilcox, safety for the New York Jets
Arthur L. Williams Jr., founder of Primerica Financial Services
Curley Williams, country music singer and songwriter; born near Cairo in Grady County

References

External links
City of Cairo official website
City of Cairo from georgia.gov

Cities in Georgia (U.S. state)
Cities in Grady County, Georgia
County seats in Georgia (U.S. state)
Jackie Robinson
Populated places established in 1835
1835 establishments in Georgia (U.S. state)